Surprise Lake is located  in the City of Surprise, Arizona, United States, on the Surprise Recreation Campus in the north-west Valley, between Bell Road and Greenway on the east side of Bullard Avenue.

Fish species
 Rainbow trout
 Largemouth bass
 Sunfish
 Catfish (channel)
 Tilapia
 Grass carp

References

External links
 Arizona Fishing Locations Map
 Arizona Boating Locations Facilities Map

Reservoirs in Arizona
Reservoirs in Maricopa County, Arizona